Metvuw Weather and Climate service is run  by James McGregor. Much of the weather content and forecast material is available directly from the website, free. A range of different weather information is available, as different pages, under the following headings.

Metvuw home 
Featuring updates advice about the service, and 'photo of the day' as well as links to previous photos of the day. Many images of quirky and unusual weather-related phenomena are to be found, especially clouds of the Mammatus variety.

Satellite imagery 
9 panels of monochrome satellite derived cloud pictures are shown, in 3 hour intervals, ending in current time slot. Images can be enlarged.
Data provided by MetService, Image enhancement by Metvuw, Himawari satellite data courtesy of Japanese Meteorological Agency.

Weather radar 
3 panels each showing 9 locations throughout New Zealand, at 3 hour intervals, ending in current time slot. Colour coding is derived from 'reflectivity' (DBz). Images can be enlarged.
Data provided by MetService, Image enhancement by Metvuw.

Radiosondes (weather balloons) measuring upper air temperatures and winds are routinely launched from five stations around New Zealand. At Whenuapai, Paraparaumu and Invercargill they are launched at 1100 and 2300 NZT. At Raoul Island they are launched daily at 1100 NZT. The upper air data are displayed on tephigrams.

Forecast charts
A large range between 1 and 10 day forecasts are available, delivering 4 and 40 images, respectively, spaced at +6 hour intervals, beginning with the forecast time.

These weather forecast charts are generated by software written and maintained by James McGregor. The data used is obtained from the United States National Weather Service. These charts are updated approximately every 6 hours and provide forecasts up to 240h ahead of the time they were issued.

Current NZ weather
Selections are available for temperature, precipitation, pressure and wind. A national map is shown with data at each of many significant locations.

Ocean weather
Data is available for each of 7 seas/oceans. Up to 10-day thumbnails deliver 40 images, spaced at +6 hour intervals, beginning with the forecast time.

See also 
 Meteorological Service of New Zealand Limited
 World Meteorological Organisation

References

External links
 metvuw

Meteorological research institutes
Wellington City